William McEwan (29 August 1914 – 1991) was a Scottish footballer.

External links 

Scottish footballers
English Football League players
Association football wingers
Petershill F.C. players
Queens Park Rangers F.C. players
Leyton Orient F.C. players
Ebbsfleet United F.C. players
Huddersfield Town A.F.C. wartime guest players
Footballers from Glasgow
1914 births
1991 deaths